Kathryn Lasky (born June 24, 1944) is an American children's writer who also writes for adults under the names Kathryn Lasky Knight and E. L. Swann. Her children's books include several Dear America books, The Royal Diaries books, Sugaring Time, The Night Journey, Wolves of the Beyond, and the Guardians of Ga'Hoole series. Her awards include Anne V. Zarrow Award for Young Readers' Literature, National Jewish Book Award, and Newbery Honor.

Biography
Kathryn Lasky grew up in Indianapolis, descendant of a line of Russian Jews. She is married to Christopher Knight, with whom she lives in Cambridge, Massachusetts. She received a bachelor's degree in English from the University of Michigan and a master's degree in early childhood education from Wheelock College.

She was the 2011 winner of the Anne V. Zarrow Award for Young Readers' Literature and her work has received many other honors and awards.

She is the author of over one hundred books. Her most notable book series is Guardians of Ga’Hoole, which has more than 8 millions copies printed. Her books has been translated into 19 languages around the world.

Her adult nonfiction work includes the 2011 book, Silk and Venom: Searching for a Dangerous Spider, a biography of the arachnologist Greta Binford, and the 2017 bestseller Night Witches, the story of Soviet women pilots of the 588th Night Bomber Regiment in WWII.

Works

Historical Works
Night Witches

Camp Princess
Born To Rule
Unicorns? Get Real!

The Royal Diaries
Elizabeth I: Red Rose of the House of Tudor (England 1544)
Marie Antoinette: Princess of Versailles (Austria-France 1769)
Mary, Queen of Scots: Queen Without a Country (France 1553)
Jahanara: Princess of Princesses (India, 1627)
Kazunomiya: Prisoner of Heaven (Japan 1858)

Dear America
A Journey to the New World: The Diary of Remember Patience Whipple, Mayflower, 1620
Dreams in the Golden Country: The Diary of Zipporah Feldman a Jewish Immigrant Girl, New York City, 1903
Christmas After All: The Great Depression Diary of Minnie Swift, Indianapolis, Indiana, 1932
A Time for Courage: The Suffragette Diary of Kathleen Bowen, Washington, D.C., 1917
Blazing West: The Journal of Augustus Pelletier, Lewis and Clark Expedition, 1804

My America
Hope In My Heart: Sofia's Immigrant Diary (also known as Hope In My Heart, Sofia's Ellis Island Diary)
Home at Last: Sofia's Immigrant Diary
An American Spring: Sofia's Immigrant Diary

Daughters of the Sea
Hannah
May
Lucy
The Crossing

Horses of the Dawn
The Escape (2014)
Star Rise (2014)
Wild Blood (2016)

Starbuck Family Adventures
Double Trouble Squared
Shadows in the Water
A Voice in the Wind

Guardians of Ga'Hoole

The Capture (also published as a movie tie-in edition in the UK as Legend of the Guardians)
The Journey
The Rescue
The Siege
The Shattering
The Burning
The Hatchling
The Outcast
The First Collier
The Coming of Hoole
To Be a King
The Golden Tree
The River of Wind
Exile
The War of the Ember
The Rise of a Legend (2013) (this is a prequel to the Guardians of Ga'Hoole series about Ezylryb)

Two guide books were released to give readers more insight into the world of Hoole. They are narrated by the owl Otulissa.

A Guide Book to the Great Tree (2007)
Lost Tales of Ga'Hoole (2010)

Wolves Of The Beyond
 Lone Wolf
 Shadow Wolf
 Watch Wolf
 Frost Wolf
 Spirit Wolf
 Star Wolf

The Deadlies
 Felix Takes the Stage
 Spiders on the Case

Bears of the Ice
 Quest of the Cubs
 The Den of Forever Frost
 The Keepers of the Key

Portraits
Dancing Through Fire (2005)

Standalone titles
The Last Girls of Pompeii
Blood Secret 
Broken Song (companion to The Night Journey)
Star Split (1999) (Published in German as 3038: Staat der Klone)
Alice Rose and Sam
True North
Beyond the Burning Time
Memoirs of a Bookbat
The Bone Wars
Pageant
Beyond the Divide
The Night Journey (1982 winner of the National Jewish Book Award for Children's Literature)
Prank
Hawksmaid: The Untold Story of Robin Hood and Maid Marian
Ashes
Chasing Orion
Home Free

Children and YA  non-fiction
John Muir: America's First Environmentalist
Interrupted Journey: Saving Endangered Sea Turtles
Silk and Venom: Searching for a Dangerous Spider (2011) Candlewick. 
Shadows in the Dawn: The Lemurs of Madagascar
The Most Beautiful Roof in the World
Sugaring Time
Days of the Dead
Searching for Laura Ingalls
Monarchs
Surtsey: The Newest Place on Earth
Dinosaur Dig
Traces of Life: The Origins of Humankind
A Baby map

Picture books
Lunch Bunnies
Show and Tell Bunnies
Science Fair Bunnies
Tumble Bunnies
Lucille's Snowsuit
Lucille Camps In
Starring Lucille
Pirate Bob
Humphrey, Albert, and the Flying Machine
Before I was Your Mother
The Man Who Made Time Travel
A Voice of Her Own: The Story of Phillis Wheatley, Slave Poet
Love That Baby
Mommy's Hands
Porkenstein
Born in the Breezes: The Voyages Of Joshua Slocum
Vision of Beauty
First Painter
The Emperor's Old Clothes
Sophie and Rose
Marven of the Great North Woods (1997 winner of the National Jewish Book Award for Children's Picture Books illustrated by Kevin Hawkes. January 2013 selection by the PJ Library.)
A Brilliant Streak: The Making of Mark Twain
Hercules: The Man, The Myth, The Hero
The Librarian Who Measured the Earth
She's Wearing a Dead Bird on Her Head!
The Gates of the Wind
Pond Year
Cloud Eyes
I Have an Aunt on Marlborough Street
Sea Swan
My Island Grandma

Adult
Other than 'Night Gardening all Lasky's works for adult readers are under the name Kathryn Lasky Knight.

Atlantic Circle (1985) (Memoir about Lasky and her husband, Chris Knight, covering their childhood years on to a trip shortly their getting married sailing a thirty-foot ketch from Maine to Europe and back.)
The Widow of Oz (1989)
Night Gardening (1999) (written under the pseudonym of E.L. Swann)

Calista Jacobs mystery
This series for adult readers was also written under the name Kathryn Lasky Knight.
Trace Elements (1986)
Mortal Words (1990)
Mumbo Jumbo (1991)
Dark Swan (1994)

References

External links

Kathryn Lasky
Interview with Kathryn Lasky  by OwlPages.com
Interview with Kathryn Lasky at BookReviewsAndMore.ca
 
 
 Kathryn Lasky Knight at LC Authorities, with 7 records (writing for adults) 
 E. L. Swann at LC Authorities, with 2 records ("writing major commercial fiction for adults")

20th-century American novelists
21st-century American novelists
American children's writers
American women novelists
1944 births
Living people
Newbery Honor winners
Wheelock College alumni
University of Michigan College of Literature, Science, and the Arts alumni
American women children's writers
20th-century American women writers
21st-century American women writers
American women non-fiction writers
20th-century American non-fiction writers
21st-century American non-fiction writers
American historical novelists
Women historical novelists
Writers of historical fiction set in the early modern period